This is the discography of French singer Michel Polnareff.

Albums

Studio albums

Collaborative albums

Live albums

Soundtrack albums
Polnareff also composed the music to the films Erotissimo, L'indiscret and the television film La pomme de son œil, which didn't have an album release.

Compilation albums

Singles and EPs

Notes

References

Discographies of French artists
Rock music discographies
Pop music discographies
Folk music discographies